Fuck the Golden Youth is the first full-length album released by The Mint Chicks on the Flying Nun label. The album was produced by singer Kody and Guitarist Ruban Nielson and recorded by the band in total isolation in a house on a beach in Northland, New Zealand which was inaccessible except at low tide.

Track listing
Tracks 1, 2, 4, 7, 8, 10, 12 composed by Kody Nielson.
Tracks 3, 11, 13 composed by Ruban Nielson.
Tracks 6, 9 composed by Kody Nielson and Ruban Nielson.
Track 5 composed by Kody Nielson, Ruban Nielson and Michael Logie.

 "Fat Gut Strut" – 3:10
 "Rubbage Rat" – 1:02
 "Fuck the Golden Youth" – 1:46
 "A Quick Show of Hands" – 3:24
 "Nothing is a Switch" – 3:23
 "Opium of the People" – 3:03
 "Take It, I Don't Want It" – 2:39
 "My Arpeggio" – 2:06
 "Licking Letters" – 2:02
 "Silver Homeless Man" – 3:03
 "So Many of You, So Few of Us" – 1:34
 "I Don't Want to Grow Old" – 2:34
 "You're Bored Because You're Boring" – 5:49

2005 debut albums
The Mint Chicks albums
Flying Nun Records albums